Que Sera Sera is a 1985 album by Johnny Thunders.

The original 1985-release of the album had ten songs. On later CD-pressings three more were added: "Que Sera, Sera", "Cool Operator" (Black Cat Remix) and Thunders' own remix of the opening track, "Short Lives", which replaced the original mix as opener of the album. "Que Sera Sera" was first released as a single (7" & 12"), backed with Thunders' remix of "Short Lives". "Tie Me Up" was earlier released as B-side to the Johnny Thunders & Patti Palladin single "Crawfish" in 1985.

Track listing
All tracks composed by Johnny Thunders; except where indicated
"Short Lives" (Thunders, Patti Palladin) 3:09
"M.I.A." 2:47
"I Only Wrote This Song for You" 2:32
"Little Bit of Whore" 2:27
"Cool Operator" (Thunders, Keith George Yon, Tony St. Helene) 6:18
"Blame It on Mom" 3:42
"Tie Me Up" (Thunders, Patti Palladin) 3:11
"Alone in a Crowd" 2:40
"Billy Boy" 3:00
"Endless Party" (Thunders, David Johansen) 2:41
"Que Sera, Sera" 3:41
"Short Lives" (original mix) 3:16
"Cool Operator" (Black Cat Remix) 5:49

Personnel
Johnny Thunders - guitar, vocals
Black Cats
Keith George Yon - bass
Tony St. Helene - drums
with:
Wilko Johnson - guitar on 5 & 10
Michael Monroe - saxophone, harmonica
John Perry - guitar, keyboards, backing vocals on 1, 3, 4, 7, 8, 10, 11, 12.
Patti Palladin - vocals 
Nasty Suicide - guitar on 1
Stiv Bators - backing vocals on 10
Dave Tregunna - backing vocals on 10
Pedro Ortiz - percussion on 7
J.C. Carroll - mandolin, accordion
Billy Rath - bass on 7
Jerry Nolan - drums on 7
Henri-Paul Tortosa - guitar on 7
John "Irish" Earle - saxophone on 7
Judd Lander - mouth organ on 7
St. Theresa School Choir - "child abuse" on 11
Technical
John McGowan, Ken Thomas - engineer
Nina Antonia - liner notes
Leee Black Childers - photography

Charts

References

Johnny Thunders albums
1985 albums